Events from the year 1194 in Ireland.

Incumbent
Lord: John

Events
Drogheda is chartered as a town.
Simon Rochfort (also Simon de Rupeforti; died 1224) was the first English Bishop of Meath.

Births

Richard Mor de Burgh (died 1242)  was the eldest son of William de Burgh and founder of the towns of Ballinasloe, Loughrea and Galway.

Deaths
Domnall Mór Ua Briain, King of Thomond

References